Aron Hector Schmitz (19 December 186113 September 1928), better known by the pseudonym Italo Svevo, was an Italian and Austro-Hungarian writer, businessman, novelist, playwright, and short story writer.

A close friend of Irish novelist and poet James Joyce, Svevo was considered a pioneer of the psychological novel in Italy and is best known for his modernist novel La coscienza di Zeno (1923), which became a widely appreciated classic of Italian literature. He was also the cousin of the Italian academic Steno Tedeschi.

Early life 
Born in Trieste (at the time in the Austrian Empire, then in Austria-Hungary since 1867) as Aron Ettore Schmitz to a Jewish German father and an Italian mother, Svevo was one of seven children, and grew up enjoying a passion for literature from a young age, reading works of Goethe, Schiller, Shakespeare, and the classics of French and Russian literature.

Svevo was a citizen of the Austro-Hungarian Empire until the end of the First World War. He spoke Italian as a second language, as he usually spoke the Triestine dialect. Due to his germanophone ancestry by his father, he and his brothers were sent to a boarding school near Würzburg, in the German Empire, where he learnt and became fluent in German.

After returning to Trieste in 1880, Svevo continued his studies for a further two years at Istituto Revoltella, before being forced to take financial responsibility when his father filed for bankruptcy, after his once successful glassware business failed. This 20-year period as a bank clerk at the Unionbank of Vienna served as inspiration for his first novel, Una Vita (1892).

During his time at the bank, Svevo contributed to Italian-language socialist publication L'Indipendente (it), and began writing plays (which he rarely finished) before beginning work on Una vita in 1887. Svevo adhered to a humanistic and democratic socialism, which predisposed him to pacifism, and to advocate for the creation of a European economic union after the war.

Following the death of his parents, Svevo married his cousin Livia Veneziani in a civil ceremony in 1896. Soon after, Livia convinced him to convert to Catholicism, and take part in a religious wedding (probably after a troublesome pregnancy). Personally, however, Svevo was an atheist. He became a partner in his wealthy father-in-law's paint business - that specialized in manufacturing industrial paint, that was used on naval warships. He became successful in growing the business, and after trips to France and Germany set up a branch of the company in England.

Svevo lived for part of his life in Charlton, south-east London, while working for a family firm. He documented this period in his letters to his wife, which highlighted the cultural differences he encountered in Edwardian England. His old home at 67 Charlton Church Lane now carries a blue plaque.

Writing career 
Svevo first started writing short stories in 1880. He took on the pseudonym "Italo Svevo" (literally "Italus the Swabian") for the publication of his first novel, Una Vita, in 1892. The novel was not a success.

His second novel, Senilità (1898), was also received poorly. In 1919 he began work on La Coscienza di Zeno (known in English as Zeno's Conscience or Confessions of Zeno).

Zeno's Conscience 
In 1923 Italo Svevo published the psychological novel La Coscienza di Zeno. The work, showing the author's interest in the theories of Sigmund Freud, is written in the form of the memoirs of Zeno Cosini, who writes them at the insistence of his psychoanalyst. Svevo's novel received almost no attention from Italian readers and critics at the time.

The work might have disappeared altogether, if it were not for the efforts of James Joyce. Joyce had met Svevo in 1907, when Joyce tutored him in English, while working for Berlitz in Trieste. Joyce read Svevo's earlier novels, Una Vita and Senilità.

Joyce championed Zeno's Conscience, helping to have it translated into French and then published in Paris, where critics praised it extravagantly. That led Italian critics, including Eugenio Montale, to discover it. Zeno Cosini, the book's hero and unreliable narrator, mirrored Svevo himself, being a businessman fascinated by Freudian theory.
Svevo was also a model for Leopold Bloom, the protagonist of Joyce's seminal novel Ulysses.

Zeno's Conscience never looks outside the narrow confines of Trieste, much like Joyce's work, which rarely left Dublin in the last years of Ireland's time as part of the United Kingdom. Svevo employed often sardonic wit in his observations of Trieste and, in particular, of his hero, an indifferent man, who cheats on his wife, lies to his psychoanalyst, and is trying to explain himself to his psychoanalyst, by revisiting his memories.

There is a final connection between Svevo and the character Cosini. Cosini sought psychoanalysis, he said, in order to discover why he was addicted to nicotine. As Svevo reveals in his memoirs, each time he had given up smoking, with the iron resolve that this would be the "ultima sigaretta!!", he experienced the exhilarating feeling that he was now beginning life over without the burden of his old habits and mistakes. That feeling was, however, so strong that he found smoking irresistible, if only so that he could stop smoking again, in order to experience that thrill once more.

Death 
After being involved in a serious car accident, he was brought into hospital at Motta di Livenza, where his health rapidly failed. As death approached, he asked one of his visitors for a cigarette. It was refused. Svevo replied: "That would have been my last." He died that afternoon.

Legacy 

Svevo, along with Luigi Pirandello, is considered a prominent figure of early 20th century Italian literature, and has had an important influence on later generations of the country's writers.

Though only recognised for his literary achievements towards the end of his life, Svevo is celebrated as one of Italy's finest writers, particularly in his home city of Trieste, and has a statue in front of the Museum of Natural History erected in his honour.

The following are named after him:
 Istituto Comprensivo Italo Svevo in Trieste, Italy
 Liceo Italo Svevo in Cologne, Germany

Selected works 
Novels
Una Vita (1892). A Life, trans. Archibald Colquhoun (1963).
 Senilità (1898). As a Man Grows Older, trans. Beryl de Zoete (1932); later as Emilio's Carnival, trans. Beth Archer Brombert (2001).
 La Coscienza di Zeno (1923). Confessions of Zeno, trans. Beryl de Zoete (1930); later as Zeno's Conscience, trans. William Weaver (2003).
Novellas
La novella del buon vecchio e della bella fanciulla (1926). The Nice Old Man and the Pretty Girl.
Una burla riuscita (1926). A Perfect Hoax, trans. J. G. Nichols (2003).
Short story collections
 La novella del buon vecchio e della bella fanciulla, e altre prose inedite e postume (1929, posthumous). The Nice Old Man and the Pretty Girl and Other Stories, trans. L. Collison-Morley (1930).
Corto viaggio sentimentale e altri racconti inediti (1949, posthumous). Short Sentimental Journey and Other Stories, trans. Beryl de Zoete, L. Collison-Morley and Ben Johnson (1967).
Other

 Saggi e pagine sparse (1954, posthumous). Essays and Scattered Pages.
 Commedie (1960, posthumous). Dramatic works.
 Lettere (1966, posthumous). Correspondence with Eugenio Montale.
Further Confessions of Zeno (1969, posthumous). Trans. Ben Johnson and P. N. Furbank. Fragments of a sequel to La coscienza di Zeno. Includes: "The Old Old Man", "An Old Man's Confessions", "Umbertino", "A Contract", "This Indolence of Mine", and Regeneration: A Comedy in Three Acts.
A Very Old Man: Stories (2022, posthumous). Trans. Frederika Randall. Includes: "The Contract", "The Confessions of a Very Old Man", "Umbertino", "My Leisure", and "Foreword".

References

Sources 
 Italo Svevo, Zeno's Conscience. Trans. William Weaver. New York: Vintage International, 2001.
 Fabio Vittorini, Italo Svevo, Milano, Mondadori, 2011
Piero Garofalo, "Time-Consciousness in Italo Svevo's La coscienza di Zeno," in Quaderni d'italianistica, XVIII.2 (Fall 1997): pp. 221–233.
 Livia Veneziani Svevo, Memoir of Italo Svevo, Preface by P. N. Furbank, Trans. by Isabel Quigly.  London: Libris, 1991. 
 Gatt-Rutter, J., Italo Svevo: A Double Life (1988)
 Moloney, Brian, Italo Svevo: A Critical Introduction (1974)
 Furbank, Philip N., Italo Svevo: The Man and the Writer (1966)
 Gatt-Rutter, J & Mulroney, B, 'This England is so different' – Italo Svevo's London Writings. Troubador

External links 

 
 
 Works by Svevo: text with concordances and frequency list
 Images referred to Italo Svevo on Immaginidistoria.it
 Listen to some chapters of La Coscienza di Zeno on audio mp3 free download

1861 births
1928 deaths
19th-century Austrian dramatists and playwrights
19th-century Austrian male writers
19th-century Austrian novelists
19th-century Austrian poets
19th-century Italian dramatists and playwrights
19th-century Italian male writers
19th-century Italian novelists
19th-century Italian poets
19th-century Italian short story writers
20th-century Italian male writers
20th-century Italian novelists
20th-century Italian poets
20th-century Italian short story writers
Austrian people of German-Jewish descent
Businesspeople from Trieste
Italian Austro-Hungarians
Italian dramatists and playwrights
Italian male dramatists and playwrights
Italian male novelists
Italian male short story writers
Italian psychological writers
Jewish Italian writers
Modernist writers
People from Austrian Littoral
Pedestrian road incident deaths
Road incident deaths in Italy
Writers from Trieste